The Berlin Micropolitan Statistical Area is the core-based statistical area centered on the urban cluster associated with the city Berlin, New Hampshire, in the United States. As defined by the Office of Management and Budget using counties as building blocks, the area consists of two counties – Coos County in New Hampshire, which contains the city of Berlin, and the adjacent Essex County in Vermont.

An alternative definition using towns as building blocks is the Berlin Micropolitan NECTA. In addition to the city of Berlin, the NECTA consists of the towns of Dummer, Gorham, Milan, Randolph, Shelburne, Stark, and Success.

As of the 2000 census, the micropolitan area had a population of 39,570 (though a July 1, 2009 estimate placed the population at 37,881). As of the 2000 census, the NECTA had a population of 16,102.

Counties
Coos County, New Hampshire
Essex County, Vermont

Communities

Coos County
Cities
Berlin (Principal city)

Towns
Carroll
Clarksville
Colebrook
Columbia
Dalton
Dummer
Errol
Gorham
Jefferson
Lancaster

Milan
Northumberland
Pittsburg
Randolph
Shelburne
Stark
Stewartstown
Stratford
Whitefield

Locations*
Erving's
Martin's
Wentworth
Grants*
Atkinson & Gilmanton Academy
Bean's
Cutt's
Dix's
Green's
Low and Burbank's
Pinkham's
Second College
Purchases*
Bean's
Chandler's
Crawford's
Hadley's
Sargent's
Thompson and Meserve's
Townships*
Cambridge
Dixville
Kilkenny
Millsfield
Odell
Success
Villages*
Dixville Notch
Census-designated places
Groveton

* In New Hampshire, locations, grants, townships (which are different from towns), and purchases are unincorporated portions of a county which are not part of any town and have limited self-government (if any, as many are uninhabited). Villages are census divisions of towns or cities, but have no separate corporate existence from the municipality they are located in.

Essex County

Towns
Averill (unorganized)
Bloomfield
Brighton
Brunswick
Canaan
Concord
East Haven
Ferdinand (unorganized)
Granby

Guildhall
Lemington
Lewis (unorganized)
Lunenburg
Maidstone
Norton
Victory

Gores*
Avery's Gore
Warren Gore
Grants*
Warner's Grant
Census-designated places
Island Pond

* In Vermont, gores and grants are unincorporated portions of a county which are not part on any town and have limited self-government (if any, as many are uninhabited). Villages are census divisions of towns or cities, but have no separate corporate existence from the municipality they are located in.

Demographics
As of the census of 2000, there were 39,570 people, 16,563 households, and 10,963 families residing within the micropolitan area. The racial makeup of the area was 97.81% White, 0.13% African American, 0.34% Native American, 0.35% Asian, 0.01% Pacific Islander, 0.17% from other races, and 1.19% from two or more races. Hispanic or Latino of any race were 0.59% of the population.

The median income for a household in the micropolitan area was $32,042, and the median income for a family was $37,819. Males had a median income of $30,041 versus $20,836 for females. The per capita income for the area was $15,803.

See also
New Hampshire census statistical areas
Vermont census statistical areas

References

External links
Berlin New Hampshire History at Weebly.com

 
Populated places in Coös County, New Hampshire
Essex County, Vermont